Pearl Akanya Ofori (born 18 March 1984) is a Ghanaian broadcast journalist, radio personality and an entrepreneur who once worked for Ghanaian radio station Citi FM (97.3) Ghana. She is a graduate of the University of Ghana (Legon). She was nominated for the Radio and Television Personality Awards (RTP) organized by Big Event Ghana in 2015 Radio and TV Personality Award.

Early life
Ofori began her early education at De Youngster's International School at Kokomlemle in Accra, and went on to attend the West African Senior High School in 2003. After her high school education, she attended the University of Ghana, Legon, where she offered a Program in Political Science, Psychology and Linguistics and majored in linguistics.

Personal
Ofori was born in Ghana's capital, Accra, to Miss Grace Owusu and have two fathers- Rev. Joseph Akanya and Mr. Benson Owusu.

Journalism career
Ofori was among few persons selected by radioUnivers, a campus-based radio station, to attend a radio training in Dakar, Senegal. In 2012, she joined Citi FM (97.3) Radio where she currently serves as a broadcast journalist.

References

External links
 "Ghana's World Cup commission judge fires at FIFA - 'We are not intimidated by anybody'", Ghana Soccernet, 11 August 2014
 "Citi FM chalks 10 years in industry, rivals visit with cake", GhanaWeb, 12 November 2014
http://www.etvghana.com/index.php/entertainment/item/3975-full-list-of-2015-rtp-awards-dr-cann-osei-asibey-odiasempa-bismark-brown-fati-shaibu-ali-pj-mozay-nominated
 "Staff of TV3 demand unpaid salaries", Ghanagist, 7 March 2014
 "June 3 Disaster: How has life been for survivors?" [Audio], Modern Ghana, 3 June 2016
http://news.ghanapoint.com/2015/08/27/citi-fms-bernard-avle-jessica-opare-safore-nominated-for-2015-rtp-awards/
 https://helpinghana.com/index.php/2018/01/28/press-statement-ame-awards-2018/

Living people
1986 births
People from Accra
Ghanaian writers
Ghanaian women writers
Ghanaian radio journalists
Ghanaian radio presenters
Ghanaian women radio presenters
University of Ghana alumni
Ghanaian women journalists